Waterford Township is a township in Clay County, Iowa, USA.  As of the 2000 census, its population was 209.

History
Waterford Township was created in 1884.

Geography
According to the USGS, it contains one cemetery, First Reformed Church.

Notes

References
 USGS Geographic Names Information System (GNIS)

External links
 US-Counties.com
 City-Data.com

Townships in Clay County, Iowa
Townships in Iowa